Majid Luke Mehdizadeh-Valoujerdy (born 5 January 1990), known professionally as Luke Jerdy, is a British actor. He is from Derby in the East Midlands, and is half-Iranian. His full name is Majid Luke Mehdizadeh-Valoujerdy, but he changed it to avoid confusing casting directors. Jerdy is best known for his portrayal of Jesse Donovan in the Channel 4 soap opera Hollyoaks, a role in which he played regularly from April 2016 until January 2020. He has also performed in the theatre.

Career
Before his role in Hollyoaks, he featured in The Turing Enigma (2011), Act/Or (2015), and Chosen (2016).

He also made an appearance in a 2011 episode of Doctors, in an episode titled "An Uneasy Harmony", playing the role of Michael Webb.

Filmography

References

1990 births
Living people
21st-century British male actors
British male television actors
British people of Iranian descent
English male soap opera actors
People from Derby